The Commission for Religious Relations with the Jews is a pontifical commission in the Roman Curia tasked with maintaining positive theological ties with Jews and Judaism. Established on 22 October 1974, it works alongside the Pontifical Council for Promoting Christian Unity.

Description
Its current President is Kurt Koch, who holds that position ex officio as President of the Pontifical Council for Promoting Christian Unity. The Vice-President is the Secretary of the Pontifical Council, Bishop Brian Farrell, L.C. The Secretary of the Commission is Father Norbert J. Hofmann, S.D.B.

The Commission has published a series of documents on Christian–Jewish reconciliation : "Guidelines and Suggestions for Implementing the Conciliar Declaration Nostra aetate No. 4" (1974), "Notes on the Correct Way to Present Jews and Judaism in Preaching and Teaching in the Roman Catholic Church. On 10 Dec. 2015 it published "The Gifts and the Calling of God Are Irrevocable” (Rom 11:29): A Reflection on Theological Questions Pertaining to Catholic–Jewish Relations on the Occasion of the 50th Anniversary of Nostra aetate (no. 4)."

There is a similar Commission for Religious Relations with Muslims, part of the Pontifical Council for Interreligious Dialogue.

See also

Catholic resistance to Nazi Germany
Index of Vatican City-related articles
International Catholic-Jewish Historical Commission
Nazi persecution of the Catholic Church
Pope Benedict XV and Judaism
Pope Benedict XVI and Judaism
Pope Francis and Judaism
Pope John Paul II and Judaism
Pope Pius XII and the Holocaust
Relations between Catholicism and Judaism
Rescue of Jews by Catholics during the Holocaust

References

External links
Commission of the Holy See for Religious Relations with the Jews  (Vatican website)
The Commission for Religious Relations with the Jews: A Crucial Endeavour of the Catholic Church
The Commission for Religious Relations with the Jews and the International Catholic-Jewish Liaison Committee 
Jewish Virtual Library

Catholicism and Judaism
Christian and Jewish interfaith dialogue
Pontifical commissions